Pasco Intermodal Train Station is a station on the Amtrak's Empire Builder line in Pasco, Washington, United States. The station is a stop on the Portland section of the Builder, and serves the Tri-Cities of Richland, Pasco, and Kennewick. The station and parking are owned by the City of Pasco. The track and platforms are owned by BNSF Railway. It is also the Greyhound Lines inter-city bus station for the Tri-Cities. Pasco is also a change point for Amtrak engineers on the Empire Builder.

Boardings and alightings

Notes and references

External links

Amtrak stations in Washington (state)
Bus stations in Washington (state)
Transit centers in the United States
Railway stations in the United States opened in 1998
Pasco, Washington
Transportation buildings and structures in Franklin County, Washington
1998 establishments in Washington (state)